Lubao Airport  is an airport serving the city of Lubao in Lomami Province, Democratic Republic of the Congo.

See also

Transport in the Democratic Republic of the Congo
 List of airports in the Democratic Republic of the Congo

References

External links
 FallingRain - Lubao
 HERE Maps - Lubao
 OpenStreetMap - Lubao
 OurAirports - Lubao
 

Airports in Lomami